Jeanne C. Hurley Simon (May 10, 1922 – February 20, 2000) was the first wife of Senator Paul Simon and the mother of former Illinois Lieutenant Governor Sheila Simon, was a state and national public official in her own right.

Early life and career
Born in Chicago, Illinois, Simon moved to Chicago's North Shore, graduating from New Trier High School. She then attended Barat College. After receiving her Bachelor of Arts, she attended law school at Northwestern University School of Law. She was admitted to the Illinois bar and practiced law including work as a Cook County Assistant State's Attorney.

Illinois House of Representatives
A member of the Illinois House of Representatives from 1957 to 1961. A supporter of the Civil Rights Movement, Hurley was a member of the  Catholic Interracial Council and the NAACP. On April 21, 1960 she married fellow State Assemblyman Paul Simon, thus becoming the first two sitting members of that body that were married to each other. She did not seek reelection, later becoming a mother to Sheila and Martin Simon, a lawyer, an author, and supporting her husband when he served as the state's lieutenant governor from 1969 to 1973, during his failed gubernatorial bid in 1972, and his terms as congressman and United States Senator until 1997.

Later career
In recognition of her lifelong advocacy of libraries and literacy, President Bill Clinton appointed her in 1993 and 1997 to two terms as chairperson of the National Commission on Libraries and Information Science, in which she served until her death from brain cancer on February 20, 2000, at the age of 77, at her home, in Makanda, Illinois. A decade after her death, her daughter Sheila became Lieutenant Governor of Illinois.

References

External links
 Booknotes interview with Jeanne Simon on Codename: ScarlettLife on the Campaign Trail by the Wife of a Presidential Candidate, July 23, 1989.
 

1922 births
2000 deaths
Politicians from Chicago
People from Madison County, Illinois
Barat College alumni
Northwestern University Pritzker School of Law alumni
Illinois lawyers
Democratic Party members of the Illinois House of Representatives
Deaths from brain tumor
Women state legislators in Illinois
20th-century American politicians
20th-century American women politicians
People from Jackson County, Illinois
20th-century American lawyers